Waldemar Brøgger may refer to:

Waldemar Christofer Brøgger (geologist) (1851–1940), Norwegian geologist
Waldemar Christofer Brøgger (writer) (1911–1991), Norwegian writer